This article is about the particular significance of the year 1983 to Wales and its people.

Incumbents

Secretary of State for Wales – Nicholas Edwards
Archbishop of Wales – Derrick Childs, Bishop of Monmouth (elected) 
Archdruid of the National Eisteddfod of Wales – Jâms Nicholas

Events
5 May - District council elections take place across Wales (and England). The Conservatives regain control of Cardiff City Council.
9 June - In the UK General Election.
The SDP, led by Roy Jenkins, allies with the Liberals and gains fourteen seats.
Stefan Terlezki becomes MP for Cardiff West.
Plaid Cymru retains two seats.
John Marek is elected for Wrexham, becoming the only Czech-speaking MP.
Geraint Howells retains Ceredigion for the Liberals.
21 June - Last coal raised at Tymawr and Lewis Merthyr Colliery.
September - The Prince Willem-Alexander of the Netherlands, heir to the Dutch throne, begins a two-year course of study at Atlantic College.
5 September - Marcher Sound is launched on 1260 AM and 95.4 FM (now BBC Radio Wales) from Wrexham, inaugurating the Marcher Radio Group.
2 October - Neil Kinnock, 41-year-old MP for Islwyn, replaces Michael Foot as leader of the UK Labour Party.
Alan Wilson discovers what he believes to be King Arthur's memorial stone at the small ruined church of St Peter-super-Montem on Mynydd-y-Gaer in Glamorgan.
The BBC National Chorus of Wales is formed.

Arts and literature

Awards
National Eisteddfod of Wales (held in Llangefni)
National Eisteddfod of Wales: Chair - Einion Evans
National Eisteddfod of Wales: Crown - Eluned Phillips
National Eisteddfod of Wales: Prose Medal - Tudor Wilson Evans

New books

English language
Walter Hugh Boore - The Odyssey of Dai Lewis
Rachel Bromwich - Dafydd ap Gwilym: Poems
Alice Thomas Ellis - The 27th Kingdom
Emyr Humphreys – The Taliesin Tradition
Nigel Jenkins - Practical Dreams
Robert Nisbet - Stories of Sheepskin
Craig Thomas - Firefox Down

Welsh language
Marion Eames - Y Gaeaf Sydd Unig
Donald Evans – Machlud Canrif
R. Tudur Jones - Ffydd ac Argyfwng Cenedl
Alan Llwyd - Yn Nydd yr Anghenfil

New drama
W. S. Jones - Ifas y tryc

Music
The Alarm - "Sixty Eight Guns" (#17 in the UK Singles Chart)
Y Cyrff form at Llanrwst
First Cardiff Singer of the World competition, won by Finnish soprano Karita Mattila
Yma o Hyd is released by Dafydd Iwan and Ar Log

Film
Owen Glendower, Prince of Wales (TV film), starring David Barry

Welsh-language films
Yr Alcoholig Llon

Broadcasting

Welsh-language television
SuperTed makes his first appearance.

English-language television
QED: Simon's War (about Simon Weston)

Sport
BBC Wales Sports Personality of the Year – Colin Jones
Boxing - David Pearce of Newport wins the British heavyweight title.

Births
11 January 
Claire Evans, beauty queen
Rhodri Gomer-Davies, rugby player and reporter
14 February - Rhydian Roberts, singer
18 February - David Vaughan, footballer
5 March - Owain Arthur, actor
28 March - Richard Jones, chess master
13 April - Nicole Cooke, cyclist
12 May - Jamie Tolley, footballer
19 May - Andrew Davies, darts player
7 June - Gareth Jewell, actor
9 June 
Kate Alicia Morgan, beauty queen
Ryan Watkins, cricketer
11 June - Huw Bennett, rugby player
19 June - Richard Evans, footballer
22 July - Ifan Evans, rugby player
6 August - Lloyd Langford, comedian
10 August - Richie Pugh, rugby player and coach
23 August - James Collins, footballer
26 August - Darren Jones, footballer
9 October - Rianti Cartwright, half-Welsh actress (in Indonesia)
5 November - David Pipe, footballer
date unknown - Myfanwy Waring, actress

Deaths
5 January - Amy Evans, singer and actress, 98
10 January (in Amsterdam) - Carwyn James, rugby coach, 53
31 January - Edwin Williams, dual-code rugby international, 84
10 February - Michael Roberts, politician, 55 (collapsed in Parliament)
3 March - Percy Morgan, cricketer, 78
20 March - Alec Jones, politician, 58
23 March - David Wynne, composer, 82
16 April - Gladys Morgan, comedienne, 84
6 June - Bryn Howells, dual-code rugby player, 72
23 June - Emrys Evans, dual-code rugby player, 72
31 August - Iorwerth Jones, dual-code rugby player, 80
1 September - John Williams, Dean of Llandaff, 76
9 September - Edgar Morgan, dual-code rugby international, 87
1 October - Ernie Finch, Wales international rugby player, 84
8 October - Ron Wynn, footballer, 59
24 October - Norman Fender, Wales dual-code rugby international, 73
2 November - Tudor Watkins, politician, 80
8 November - E. G. Bowen, geographer, 82
15 November (in London) - Dai Rees, golfer, 70
30 November - Richard Llewellyn, novelist, 76
30 December - Ellis Evans, Dean of Monmouth, 75
date unknown - Mary Vaughan Jones, novelist, 64/65

See also
1983 Cardiff City Council election
1983 in Northern Ireland

References

 
Wales
 Wales